The 2015 season was Washington Spirit's third season of existence in which they competed in the National Women's Soccer League, the top division of women's soccer in the United States.

Review
Building off 2014's playoff achievement, the Spirit added a few key contributors including midfielder Joanna Lohman (from Boston Breakers), defenders Megan Oyster (drafted out of UCLA) and Katherine Reynolds (from Western New York Flash), and Nigerian international Francisca Ordega (signed from Piteå IF).
The season also served as the breakout year for Crystal Dunn who was awarded the 2015 NWSL Golden Boot Award, scoring 15 goals during the campaign.

The Spirit finished the 2015 season with a record of 8-6-6 and repeating their 4th place league position.  The playoff result, again, ended in an away loss to Seattle in the semifinals.

At the conclusion of the season, Mark Parsons stepped down as head coach and general manager to take over as coach of the Portland Thorns FC.

Club

Roster 
As of May 15, 2017

 (FP)

 (FP)

 (FP)

 (FP)

 (FP)

 (FP)

 (FP) = Federation player
* – denotes amateur call-ups

Team management

Competitions

Regular season

Regular-season standings

Results summary

NWSL Playoffs

Squad statistics 

Source: NWSL

Key to positions: FW – Forward, MF – Midfielder, DF – Defender, GK – Goalkeeper

Transfers

In

Out

Honors and awards

NWSL Yearly Awards

NWSL Most Valuable Player

NWSL Golden Boot

NWSL Team of the Year

NWSL Player of the Month

See also 
 2015 National Women's Soccer League season

References

External links 
 

Washington Spirit seasons
Washington Spirit
Washington Spirit
Washington Spirit